Moritz Kellerhoven (1758 - 15 December 1830) was a German portrait painter and etcher.

Life
Kellerhoven was born in the Altenrath district of Troisdorf. He was still very young when his father died, so he was placed in the care of his maternal uncle (a clergyman) who lived in Düsseldorf. He was originally educated with the intent of his joining the clergy too, but he showed an aptitude for art instead and, at the age of seventeen was sent to the Kunstakademie Düsseldorf, where he studied with Lambert Krahe.

Further studies took him to Antwerp, London and Paris. In 1779, he went to Vienna and, in 1782, to Italy. By 1784, he was well-known and received an appointment as Court Painter to Elector Karl Theodor in Munich. Upon the recommendation of Johann Peter von Langer (an acquaintance from Düsseldorf) he became one of the first professors at the Academy of Fine Arts Munich after its reorganization in 1808. He remained there as a teacher and manager until his death and earned a reputation as one of Germany's greatest portrait painters. He eventually portrayed almost every member of the Bavarian nobility and clergy. His most familiar portrait is that of Maximilian I in his coronation robes, which has been used as an illustration in many historical texts.

Kellerhoven was married, with several daughters and a son, Joseph, who also became a well-known portrait painter. In his last years he suffered from arthritis and gout, which eventually, in the spring of 1830, afflicted his throat and led to his death. He died in Munich and is buried in the Alter Südfriedhof.

References

Further reading

External links

 Nekrolog. Moritz Kellerhoven, in: Morgenblatt für gebildete Leser, Beilage Kunstblatt Nr. 44 vom 2. Juni 1831 (Digitalisat)
 Joseph Heller: Praktisches Handbuch für Kupferstichsammler, Leipzig 1850, S. 348 f. (Digitalisat)

1758 births
1830 deaths
18th-century German painters
18th-century German male artists
German male painters
19th-century German painters
19th-century German male artists